Christopher William Stoneking (born 15 March 1974), known professionally as C. W. Stoneking, is an Australian blues singer-songwriter, guitarist and banjo player. At the ARIA Music Awards of 2009 Jungle Blues won Best Blues and Roots Album; he was also nominated for Best Male Artist, Breakthrough Artist – Album, Best Independent Release and Best Cover Art. Gon' Boogaloo peaked at No. 17 on the ARIA Albums Chart and won at the 2015 ARIA Music Awards for Best Blues & Roots Album.

Biography
C. W. Stoneking was born in Katherine, Northern Territory, in 1974, the son of Billy Marshall Stoneking and author Paty Marshall-Stace.

In 2005, Stoneking recorded an album of original blues compositions titled King Hokum. The album was received with great critical acclaim in the Australian media after its release in 2006. In 2006, Stoneking formed his backing band, the Primitive Horn Orchestra, with whom he still performs. The current line-up is James Clark (tuba, double bass), Stephen Grant (cornet), Stu Barker (trombone) and Johnny Machin (drums).

In 2006, radio presenter Tim Ritchie chose King Hokum as his album of the year on Radio National's Breakfast program. Radio National also presented his February 2007 Australia-wide tour. King Hokum was nominated for the Best Blues/Roots Album in the ARIA Music Awards of 2007. It won the Best Independent Blues Release award in the 2007 AIR Awards (Australian Independent Record Industry Awards).

In 1999, Stoneking independently released two albums recorded in 1998.

King Hokum was rebased in 2005, his third album, but first of original compositions.  On 20 October 2008, Stoneking released Jungle Blues, his second album of original compositions, which peaked at No. 45 on the ARIA Albums Chart. Jungle Blues won Best Blues and Roots Album, and was nominated for Best Independent Release, Best Male Artist and Best Album Cover Art at the ARIA Music Awards of 2009. At the fourth annual AIR Awards held on 22 November 2009, Stoneking was nominated for Best Independent Album, Best Independent Blues/ Roots Album, and Independent Artist of the Year, with Jungle Blues winning the award for Best Independent Blues/ Roots Album. Jungle Blues was also shortlisted in the 2008 Australian Music Prize. He appeared on Later... with Jools Holland on 5 October 2010, playing " Jungle Blues" and "Jungle Lullaby".

In 2013, Stoneking voice acted in Tome of the Unknown, in the part of John Crops, which was the precursor to the mini series Over The Garden Wall.

Stoneking's next album, Gon' Boogaloo, was released on 17 October 2014. It peaked at No. 17 on the ARIA Albums Chart. At the 2015 ARIA Music Awards, Gon' Boogaloo won Best Blues & Roots Album.

Stoneking appeared on American singer-songwriter Jack White's third studio album, Boarding House Reach, which was released on 23 March 2018.

Discography

Albums

Awards and nominations

AIR Awards
The Australian Independent Record Awards (commonly known informally as AIR Awards) is an annual awards night to recognise, promote and celebrate the success of Australia's Independent Music sector.

|-
| 2007
|King Hokum 
| Best Independent Blues and Roots Album
| 
|-
| rowspan="3"| 2009
| rowspan="2"|Jungle Blues 
| Best Independent Blues and Roots Album
| 
|-
|Best Independent Album
| 
|-
| himself
|Best Independent Artist
| 
|-
| 2015
|Gon' Boogaloo 
| Best Independent Blues and Roots Album
| 
|-

ARIA Awards
The Australian Recording Industry Association Music Awards (commonly known informally as ARIA Music Awards or ARIA Awards) is an annual series of awards nights celebrating the Australian music industry, put on by the Australian Recording Industry Association (ARIA).

|-
| 2007
| King Hokum
| Best Blues & Roots Album
| 
|-
| rowspan="4"| 2009
| rowspan="4"| Jungle Blues
| Best Blues & Roots Album
| 
|-
| Best Male Artist
| 
|-
| Best Cover Art
| 
|-
| Best Independent Release
| 
|-
| 2015
| Gon' Boogaloo
| Best Blues & Roots Album
| 
|-

Australian Music Prize
The Australian Music Prize (the AMP) is an annual award of $30,000 given to an Australian band or solo artist in recognition of the merit of an album released during the year of award. The commenced in 2005.

|-
| 2008
|Jungle Blues
| Australian Music Prize
| 
|-
| 2014
| Gon' Boogaloo
| Australian Music Prize
| 
|-

Music Victoria Awards
The Music Victoria Awards, are an annual awards night celebrating Victorian music. They commenced in 2005 (although nominee and winners are unknown from 2005 to 2012).

|-
| 2015
| himself 
| Best Male Artist
| 
|-
| rowspan="2"| 2016
| rowspan="2"| himself 
| Best Male Artist
| 
|-
| Best Regional Act
| 
|-

National Live Music Awards
The National Live Music Awards (NLMAs) are a broad recognition of Australia's diverse live industry, celebrating the success of the Australian live scene. The awards commenced in 2016.

|-
|  2017
| C.W. Stoneking
| Live Blues and Roots Act of the Year
| 
|-
| 2018
| C.W. Stoneking
| Live Blues and Roots Act of the Year
|

References

External links
 
 Interview with Stoneking on Music Towers
 Interview with Stoneking on Yuzu Melodies
 Evangelist Record Company

Living people
ARIA Award winners
Australian blues guitarists
Australian male guitarists
Australian blues singers
1974 births
21st-century Australian singers
21st-century guitarists
21st-century Australian male singers
Low Transit Industries artists
Australian banjoists